Poa foliosa is a species of tussock grass commonly known as muttonbird poa.  It is native to the subantarctic islands of New Zealand and Australia.

Description
Poa foliosa is a perennial, dioecious grass growing as densely clumped tussocks up to 2 m in height.  The tussocks arise from short, woody stolons, with the shoots covered at the base by the fibrous remnants of sheaths.  The leaf-blades are 150–400 mm long and 3–6 mm wide.  The plant flowers from October to December, and fruits from November to April.

Distribution and habitat
In New Zealand the grass is found on the north-eastern Titi, or Muttonbird, Islands, as well as on the Solander, Snares, Antipodes, Auckland and Campbell Islands.  It is also found on Australia's Macquarie Island.  The habitat is coastal and subcoastal, often near seabird colonies.

Macquarie Island
On Macquarie Island's coastal terraces and slopes it grows in mixed stands with Stilbocarpa polaris where the drainage is good, and along the borders of streams.  It forms a tall tussock grassland along the beaches above the high-water mark, as well as patchily on the island's plateau in sheltered and relatively exposed sites.  The upland grasslands are an important habitat for burrow-nesting petrels.

Taxonomy
The species was first described in 1845 as Festuca foliosa by Joseph Hooker. In 1864 he redescribed it as belonging to the genus Poa.

Conservation status
In both 2009 and 2012 it was deemed to be "At Risk - Naturally Uncommon" under the New Zealand Threat Classification System, and this New Zealand classification was reaffirmed in 2018 (due to its restricted range), with a further comment that it was safe overseas.

References

foliosa
Bunchgrasses of Australasia
Grasses of New Zealand
Flora of the Campbell Islands
Flora of Macquarie Island
Flora of the Auckland Islands
Poales of Australia
Plants described in 1864
Taxa named by Joseph Dalton Hooker
Plants described in 1845
Dioecious plants